Lincoln is an elevated station on the Millennium Line of Metro Vancouver's SkyTrain rapid transit system in Coquitlam, British Columbia. It is located on Pinetree Way, situated between Lincoln and Northern Avenues. Coquitlam Centre and Henderson Place shopping centres are located within walking distance from the station.

History
Lincoln station was opened in 2016 along with five other stations when the Millennium Line's Evergreen Extension was completed. The station was designed by the architecture firm Perkins+Will.

The initial plan for the extension did not include Lincoln station as it was determined that Coquitlam Central station would be sufficiently close to the nearby shopping centres and various amenities; however, the owners of the Coquitlam Centre mall and the developers of other nearby residential projects wanted a closer station. As a result, the station was added to the project and the requesting parties paid the $28-million cost for its construction.

Station information

Station layout

Entrances
Lincoln station is served by a single entrance facing the north end of the station. The entrance is located at the southwest corner of the intersection of Northern Avenue and Pinetree Way.

Transit connections

Lincoln station provides connections to several Tri-Cities bus routes. Bus bay assignments are as follows:

References

Millennium Line stations
Evergreen Extension stations
Railway stations in Canada opened in 2016
Buildings and structures in Coquitlam
2016 establishments in British Columbia